Kaftan is a surname. People include:

 Dirk Kaftan (born 1971), German conductor
 Fred F. Kaftan (1916–2001), member of the Wisconsin State Senate
 George Kaftan (born 1928), American basketball player
 Julius Kaftan (1848–1926), German Protestant theologian
 Vylar Kaftan, American science fiction and fantasy writer

Surnames